= Ernst Würthwein =

German theologian (1909–1996)

- Born: 20 September 1909; Tübingen, Germany
- Died: 7 February 1996 (aged 86); Marburg, Germany

Academic work
- Discipline: theology
- Institutions: University of Marburg
- Main interests: textual history of the Old Testament

Ernst Würthwein (20 September 1909 – 7 February 1996) was a German Protestant theologian.

He was a professor of Old Testament at the University of Marburg. He worked mainly on questions of textual history of the Old Testament. He was the author and co-author of numerous books.
